Elaphrus sugai is a species of ground beetle in the subfamily Elaphrinae. It was described by Nanake in 1987.

References

Elaphrinae
Beetles described in 1987